Endoxyla encalypti, the wattle goat moth, is an endangered giant moth of the family Cossidae. It is found in Australia, where it has been recorded along the eastern coast from Queensland through New South Wales and Victoria to Tasmania.

References

Moths described in 1854
Endoxyla (moth)